The Epte is a river in Seine-Maritime and Eure, in Normandy, France. The river rises in Seine-Maritime in the Pays de Bray, near Forges-les-Eaux. The river empties into the Seine not far from Giverny. One of its tributaries is the Aubette de Magny.

In 911 the Treaty of Saint-Clair-sur-Epte established the river as the historical boundary of Normandy and Île-de-France.

Claude Monet lived at Giverny near the river for more than forty years. In his garden, by diverting a branch of the Epte, he established a water garden with its famous water-lily pond and its Japanese-style bridge.  The river appears in a number of his works, including Peupliers au bord de l'Epte.

References

Rivers of France
Rivers of Eure
Rivers of Seine-Maritime
Rivers of Normandy